Sir William Hovell Browne ffolkes, 3rd Baronet (21 November 1847 – 9 May 1912) was an English Liberal politician who sat in the House of Commons from 1880 to 1885.

ffolkes was the son of  Martin William Browne ffolkes and his wife Henrietta Bridget Wale, daughter of Sir Charles Wale  of Little Shelford, Cambridgeshire. He was educated at Harrow School and at Trinity College, Cambridge. His father was killed by lightning in 1849 and he succeeded his grandfather Sir William ffolkes, 2nd Baronet to the baronetcy in 1860. He was a captain in the Norfolk Artillery Militia and was a J.P. and Deputy Lieutenant.  In 1876 he was High Sheriff of Norfolk.

ffolkes stood for parliament unsuccessfully at King's Lynn in 1874. At the 1880 general election he was elected Member of Parliament for King's Lynn. He held the seat until 1885. He became chairman of Norfolk County Council and was awarded KCVO in 1909.

ffolkes lived at Hillington Hall and died at the age of 64.

ffolkes married Emily Charlotte Elwes, daughter of Robert Elwes of Congham House, Norfolk in 1875.  His only daughter married John Dawnay, 9th Viscount Downe, and had issue. He was succeeded in the baronetcy by his cousin.

References

External links
 

1847 births
1912 deaths
Liberal Party (UK) MPs for English constituencies
UK MPs 1880–1885
People educated at Harrow School
Alumni of Trinity College, Cambridge
Knights Commander of the Royal Victorian Order
High Sheriffs of Norfolk
Members of Norfolk County Council
Deputy Lieutenants of Norfolk
Baronets in the Baronetage of Great Britain
People from Hillington, Norfolk